This One or None (German: Die - oder keine) is a 1932 German musical film directed by Carl Froelich and starring Gitta Alpar, Max Hansen and Ferdinand von Alten. It is part of the tradition of operetta films. It was shot at the Johannisthal Studios in Berlin. The film's sets were designed by the art director Franz Schroedter. Location shooting took place around Berlin at the Brandenburg Gate, Potsdamer Platz and Unter den Linden.

Cast
 Gitta Alpar as Eva Petri  
 Max Hansen as Prince Michael von Marana  
 Ferdinand von Alten as Prince Wenzel von Marana  
 Paul Otto as Ravel, Bankier  
 Fritz Fischer as Florian, Tenor  
 Paul Henckels as Montalon, Michaels Adjutant  
 Rudolf Platte as Officer  
 Wolfgang von Schwindt as Ein Bassist  
 Erich Fuchs as Ein Bariton 
 Lucy Malata as Eine Altastin  
 Barnabás von Géczy as Primgeiger  
 Comedian Harmonists as Themselves

References

Bibliography 
 Bock, Hans-Michael & Bergfelder, Tim. The Concise Cinegraph: Encyclopaedia of German Cinema. Berghahn Books, 2009.
 Klaus, Ulrich J. Deutsche Tonfilme: Jahrgang 1932. Klaus-Archiv, 1988.

External links 
 

1932 films
1932 musical films
German musical films
Films of the Weimar Republic
1930s German-language films
Films directed by Carl Froelich
Operetta films
German black-and-white films
Films shot in Berlin
1930s German films
Films shot at Johannisthal Studios